Boris Sandjo (born May 22, 1990) is a Central African Republic soccer player, who plays for Derbaki Football Center 8.

Playing career
Sandjo plays as a striker.

Birkirkara
In the summer of 2007 he joined Birkirkara. Just six minutes into his debut game against Hibernians, he suffered a serious injury which would keep him out for the rest of the season. Because of that he was released so the club could sign a third foreigner - fellow Central African Republic player Marcelin Tamboulas.

International career
He has played 11 matches scoring 6 with the senior National Team.

Notes

1987 births
Living people
Expatriate footballers in Malta
Central African Republic footballers
Central African Republic international footballers
AS Tempête Mocaf players
Expatriate footballers in Gabon
Central African Republic expatriate sportspeople in Gabon
Central African Republic expatriate footballers
Association football forwards